Albert Ramos Viñolas defeated Cameron Norrie in the final, 4–6, 6–3, 7–6(7–3) to win the singles tennis title at the 2021 Estoril Open. It marked his third career ATP Tour singles title, all of which have been on clay. Norrie was aiming to win his first ATP Tour title in his second final.

Stefanos Tsitsipas was the defending champion from when the tournament was last held in 2019, but did not return to compete.

Seeds
The top four seeds received a bye into the second round.

Draw

Finals

Top half

Bottom half

Qualifying

Seeds

Qualifiers

Lucky loser

Qualifying draw

First qualifier

Second qualifier

Third qualifier

Fourth qualifier

References

External links
 Main draw
 Qualifying draw

Singles